Tietze may refer to:

 Alexander Tietze (1864–1927), German physician
 Andreas Tietze  (1914-2003), Austrian Turkologist
 Christopher Tietze (1908-1984), United States physician
 Emil Tietze (1845-1931), Austrian geologist
 Erica Tietze-Conrat (1883−1958), Austrian female art historian
 Friedel Tietze, German athlete
 Hans Tietze (1880−1954), Austrian art historian
 Heinrich Franz Friedrich Tietze (1880-1964), an Austrian mathematician
 Herbert Tietze (born 1909), German jurist; (de)
 Carin C. Tietze (born 1964), German actress; (de)
 Karin Tietze-Ludwig (born 1941), German female journalist; (de)
 Lutz Friedjan Tietze (born 1942), German chemist
 Mark-Stefan Tietze; (de)
 Martin Tietze (1908-1942)

Tieze 

 Franz Tieze

See also 
 Tietze (disambiguation)
 Tietz

Surnames
Surnames from given names